Economics and Human Biology is a quarterly peer-reviewed academic journal published by Elsevier since 2003. It is an interdisciplinary periodical covering research on biological economics — economics in the context of human biology and health. The current editors-in-chief are Susan Averett, Joerg Baten and Pinka Chatterji.

According to the Journal Citation Reports, the journal has a 2020 impact factor of 2.184.

See also 
 Anthropometry
 Antebellum Puzzle
 Body mass index
 History of anthropometry
 Human height
 Human body weight

References

Economics journals
Human biology journals
English-language journals
Elsevier academic journals
Quarterly journals
Personality journals